Palmer is a village in Christian County, Illinois, United States. The population was 216 at the 2010 census.

Geography
Palmer is located at  (39.457636, - 89.406232).

Demographics

As of the 2020 census there were 216 people, 119 households, and 94 families residing in the village. The racial makeup of the village was 95.83% White, and 4.17% from two or more races. Hispanic or Latino of any race were 0.46% of the population.

There were 119 households, out of which 41.18% had children under the age of 18 living with them, 53.78% were married couples living together, 11.76% had a female householder with no husband present, and 21.01% were non-families. 16.81% of all households were made up of individuals, and 14.29% had someone living alone who was 65 years of age or older. The average household size was 2.66 and the average family size was 2.42.

The village's age distribution consisted of 21.9% under the age of 18, 11.5% from 18 to 24, 19.5% from 25 to 44, 25% from 45 to 64, and 22.2% who were 65 years of age or older. The median age was 43.5 years. For every 100 females, there were 105.7 males. For every 100 females age 18 and over, there were 114.3 males.

The median income for a household in the village was $65,625, and the median income for a family was $75,625. Males had a median income of $37,188 versus $31,250 for females. The per capita income for the village was $24,719. About 3.2% of families and 4.2% of the population were below the poverty line, including 3.2% of those under age 18 and 1.6% of those age 65 or over.

History
Sometimes a railroad or highway built through a small town causes that place to grow; It was not so with Palmer. Palmer has maintained the same population for many years. The school building was abandoned and then torn down and the children are now bused to Morrisonville. The Palmer State Bank opened in 1912 and was the oldest state bank in the Christian County. It was the only one that did not close during the Depression, but finally, shut its doors in 2006.

Churches
Palmer Advent Christian Church

Cemeteries
Anderson Cemetery
Harpers Ferry Cemetery
St. Joseph's Durbin Cemetery

Early history of Palmer

The coming of the railroad in 1870 sounded the doom of Harpers Ferry, located on the Old Edwardsville Road. Harpers Ferry hosted a post office for Star Route pony express, a mill for grinding grain, a wayside station for the Stagecoach, and a few stores. The new village was laid out early in 1869 by J.H. Boyd and J.M. Simpson and was surveyed and platted by Richard V. Powell. Boyd and Simpson erected the first store in 1869 and the firm of Starke and Hailey put in a stock of goods. Boyd erected a hotel and his residence was included within the town limits. James McCauley opened the second store and when the first post office was established in 1870 it was housed in his building with G.E. Starke the first postmaster.

The village was incorporated on February 5, 1873, at a meeting called for that purpose. Forty-one votes were cast in favor of incorporation, and one against, giving as his reason for voting "no"-"to keep saloons out of the neighborhood." The village was given the name Palmer in honor of John M. Palmer, a major-general in the Union army and then Illinois governor from 1869 to 1873.

During the history of Palmer, there have been hardware stores, millinery stores, restaurants, lumber yards, harness shops, grocery stores, drug stores, shoe shops, butcher shops, elevators, blacksmith shops, saloons, hotels, pool halls, livery stables, bakeries, garages, post offices, and barber shops.  The first hotel was owned by a family named the Stockings, the family of Ashley Basil, a 5-year-old killed in 1895 in the old coal shaft. Her final resting place is in Harpers Ferry.

Mining industry

A familiar landmark in Palmer is the old coal shaft. At one time it was the dream of a group of citizens in the area to sink a coal mine, bringing industry, employment, and fuel to the community. The site selected to sink the mine was in the southwest edge of town, on the north side of the railroad. According to ledgers still in existence, kept on sinking of the shaft, MacDonald and Bro., did the drilling. On March 30, 1872, the first share of stock was sold to Suplines Judd for $100. Many other shares were also sold for $100, some for $70 and some for $50. A total of seventy-two shares were sold in the amount of $5,460. Corporation papers were recorded on June 14, 1872. The last entry made in the ledger was Nov. 3, 1873, the sinking of the shaft was abandoned with no reason given.

About 1932, Illinois State Route 48 was constructed through Palmer - part of it over the top of the old mine. On Sept. 10, 1969, the old mine shaft, so long abandoned, become more dangerous than ever before. At 9:00 a.m. a little hole was visible, as though someone had hauled dirt away. The old mine shaft had caved in. Traffic was re-routed from the highway and the trains on the Norfolk and Western traveled at a very slow speed, as the Highway Department was afraid of a further cave in. Approximately 190 truckloads of slag, rock, and dirt were hauled to the site and the shaft was filled at an estimated cost of $30,000.

References

Villages in Christian County, Illinois
Villages in Illinois
Populated places established in 1873